Roald & Beatrix: The Tail of the Curious Mouse is a Sky original made-for-television drama film inspired by the true story of a six-year-old Roald Dahl meeting his idol Beatrix Potter. It was written by Abigail Wilson and directed by David Kerr starring Dawn French as Beatrix Potter, Rob Brydon as William Heelis and Jessica Hynes as Sofie Dahl.

Storyline
Set in 1922, Roald & Beatrix: The Tail of the Curious Mouse is a comedy drama inspired by the true story which follows six-year-old Roald Dahl (Harry Tayler) as he sets off on an adventure to meet his favourite author, Beatrix Potter (Dawn French).

The famed author Beatrix Potter is coming to the end of her career. With her publisher hounding her for her next draft, she's unable to concentrate and has had enough of writing children's books. It's not just her motivation that she has lost, her optometrist has recognised she has failing eyesight. With Christmas approaching, Beatrix is pressured, feeling increasingly out of touch with her readers, not to mention the trespassing fans and jovial door-knocking carol singers.

Her Cumbrian farm and ever-growing Herdwick sheep flock, her long-suffering husband William and disobedient animals including much loved pig called Sally, act as her only real comfort as she looks for inspiration and resists taking the easy way out with her Publisher.

Two hundred or so miles away in Wales, life is changing for an anxious young boy called Roald. Having recently lost his older sister and now his father, the once happy six-year-old has found solace and comfort in books. The beloved tales of Peter Rabbit and Jemima Puddle-Duck fill his mind, distracting him from the funeral, sadness and the revelation that he might be sent to boarding school.

Wanting to run away, he is encouraged by his mother Sofie (Jessica Hynes) to follow his dreams and visit his hero Beatrix Potter. Roald pushes his anxiety aside and they set off on his first big adventure. Their extraordinary journey is filled with unpredictable and humorous characters all of whom ignite Roald's imagination and provide comfort to his grieving mother.

The dream of meeting his favourite author is eventually realised and their very special encounter proves to be both a magical and life changing moment for them both.

Cast
 Dawn French as Beatrix Potter
 Rob Brydon as  William Heelis
 Jessica Hynes as Sofie Dahl
 Harry Tayler as young Roald Dahl
 Alison Steadman as Dora
 Bill Bailey as Bona Fide Gent
 Nina Sosanya as Anne Landy
 Nick Mohammed as Mr. Entwhistle

Production

Filming 
Roald & Beatrix: The Tail of the Curious Mouse was filmed in Wales

Title Sequence 
The title sequence is animated to look like layers of cut out paper. It was made by Peter Anderson Studio and nominated for a BAFTA award at the British Academy Television Craft Awards in the category Television Craft | Titles & Graphic Identity in 2021.

Critical reception 
Reviewing the book for the Financial Times, Suzy Feay wrote "a Christmas classic is born". Anita Singh at The Telegraph gave it three stars and called it "A sweet tale of a very unlikely meeting". The Spectator said it was "essential national viewing". while The Independent also gave it three stars with Adam White mentioning "This only-slightly-true Sky One film is gentle fun for all the family." Lauren Morris at The Radio Times gave it four stars, describing it as a "heart-warming Christmas tonic for fans of all ages."

References

External links
 
 Official Website

Sky UK original programming
2020 television films
2020 films
Beatrix Potter
British drama films
Drama films based on actual events
Films set in the 1920s
 
2020 drama films
Films directed by David Kerr (director)
2020s English-language films
2020s British films